Davidiella tassiana is a fungal plant pathogen infecting several hosts, including Iris barnumiae subsp. demawendica in Iran.

Infected plant species 
Davidiella tassiana has a wide range of host species. These include:

Agrostis canina 
Agrostis stolonifera
Anthoxanthum odoratum 
Arabis petraea
Bistorta vivipara
Carex bigelowii
Carex capitata
Draba incana
Draba nivalis
Deschampsia caespitosa 
Epilobium latifolium
Galium normanii
Gentianella amarella ssp. septentrionalis
Hierochloe odorata
Juncus alpinus
Juncus articulatus
Juncus triglumis
Luzula arcuata
Poa alpina
Poa glauca
Poa nemoralis
Potentilla palustris
Puccinellia distans
Ranunculus glacialis
Rhodiola rosea
Saxifraga caespitosa
Saxifraga hirculus
Thalictrum alpinum
Thymus praecox ssp. arcticus

References 

Fungal plant pathogens and diseases
Food plant pathogens and diseases
Davidiellaceae
Fungi described in 1865
Taxa named  by Giuseppe De Notaris